TKB-011 (ТКБ-011), TKB-011M (ТКБ-011М) and TKB-011 2M (ТКБ-011 2М) were Soviet bullpup assault rifles, capable of fully automatic fire, chambered for the 7.62×39mm round, developed by the small arms designer Nikolai M. Afanasyev from 1963 to 1965.

The internals of the weapons were made of steel and the externals bakelite. These assault rifles and the TKB-022PM were the first to use a tunnel type ejection port, which is now used on the FN F2000.

See also
TKB-022PM
TKB-0146
List of Russian Weaponry
List of bullpup firearms
List of assault rifles

References

External links
 TKB-011
 TKB-011M
 TKB-011 2M

7.62×39mm assault rifles
Assault rifles of the Soviet Union
Bullpup rifles
Trial and research firearms of the Soviet Union